Georgia originally planned to participate in the Eurovision Song Contest 2009 with the song "We Don't Wanna Put In" written by Stephane Mgebrishvili and Bibi Kvachadze. The song was performed by the group Stephane and 3G. The Georgian broadcaster Georgian Public Broadcaster (GPB) held a national final in order to select the Georgian entry for the 2009 contest in Moscow, Russia. An open call for submissions was held which resulted in the shortlisting of ten entries that were presented to the public during a televised production on 18 February 2009. The results of a public televote combined with the votes of an expert jury resulted in the selection of "We Don't Wanna Put In" performed by Stephane and 3G as the Georgian entry.

Georgia was drawn to compete in the first semi-final of the Eurovision Song Contest which took place on 12 May 2009. However, on 11 March, GPB announced its withdrawal from the contest after "We Don't Wanna Put In" was rejected by the European Broadcasting Union (EBU) for perceived political references to Russian Prime Minister Vladimir Putin.

Background 

Prior to the 2009 Contest, Georgia had participated in the Eurovision Song Contest two times since their first entry in 2007. The nation's highest placing in the contest, to this point, has been eleventh place, which was achieved in 2008 with the song "Peace Will Come" performed by Diana Gurtskaya. Following the introduction of semi-finals, Georgia has managed to qualify to the final on each occasion the nation has participated in.

The Georgian national broadcaster, Georgian Public Broadcaster (GPB), broadcasts the event within Georgia and organises the selection process for the nation's entry. Despite initially announcing on 28 August 2008 that the country would not participate in the 2009 Eurovision Song Contest in protest to host country Russia's foreign policies caused by the 2008 South Ossetia war (also known as the Russo-Georgian War), stating that they refuse to "participate in a contest organised by a country that violates human rights and international laws", the broadcaster ultimately confirmed their intentions to participate at the 2009 contest on 19 December 2008 following talks with the contest organisers and taking into account Georgia's victory at the Junior Eurovision Song Contest 2008, in which Russia awarded top marks to the country.

Before Eurovision

National final 
GPB opened a public submission from 22 January 2008 until 5 February 2009. 25 entries were received by the submission deadline and an expert commission selected the top ten songs from the received submissions, which were announced on 13 February 2009 and presented to the public via a special programme on 18 February 2009 at the GPB studios in Tbilisi, hosted by Nika Lomidze and broadcast on the GPB First Channel as well as online at the broadcaster's website 1tv.ge. The winner, "We Don't Wanna Put In" performed by Stephane and 3G, was determined upon by the 50/50 combination of the votes of an expert jury headed by British producer Stephen Budd (70%) and a public televote (30%). In addition to the performances of the competing entries, 2008 Georgian Junior Eurovision winners Bzikebi performed as a guest.

Song controversy and withdrawal
The 2009 Georgian entry garnered international media exposure due to political connotations in its lyrics of the song "We Don't Wanna Put In". It was also reported that the song was ineligible to compete due to the European Broadcasting Union (EBU) rules forbidding "lyrics, speeches, gestures of a political or similar nature". Stephane and 3G's accented pronunciation of the words "put in" were noted as resembling the pronunciation of the surname of Russian prime minister Vladimir Putin, and in the context of the previous year's 2008 South Ossetia war the song's lyrics were considered by some as a slight against Russia and Putin. GPB denied that the song was of a political nature, while the EBU refused to make a statement until the song was officially submitted to them. On 2 March, a protest against the song, organised by the Young Russia political group, was held in Moscow, Russia.

After "We Don't Wanna Put In" had been submitted to the EBU, on 10 March, GPB was requested to either re-write the lyrics of the song or select a new entry after it was deemed that the song's lyrics did not comply with the rules of the contest regarding political connotations. On 11 March, the broadcaster announced Georgia's withdrawal from the contest after they refused to change the song lyrics citing the EBU being "under unprecedented Russian pressure" (although no evidence of pressure being applied has been provided). The country's withdrawal was confirmed on 16 March during the running order draw. Georgia was set to perform in the first semi-final, to be held on 12 May 2009.

See also
 Georgia–Russia relations

References

2009
Countries in the Eurovision Song Contest 2009
Eurovision